Presidential elections were held in El Salvador on 4 December 1864. Francisco Dueñas ran unopposed and was elected by the legislature.

Results

References

El Salvador
President
Election and referendum articles with incomplete results
Presidential elections in El Salvador
Single-candidate elections